Beri (also spelled as Berry) is a surname found among Khatris. According to a folklore, their ancestor was born under a Beri tree which is how they derive their name. They were originally Chopras. They are found in Jagraon and Ludhiana.

Notable people 

 Rajinder Beri, President of the District Congress Committee Jalandhar
 Ritu Beri, fashion designer
 Sudesh Berry, Indian actor
 Suraj Berry, Vice Admiral of Indian Navy

References 

Indian surnames